The 1974-75 Primera División was the 32nd season of the Primera División de Fútbol de El Salvador, the top tier of football in El Salvador.  Platense won their 1st national title and became the second team to win a national title following promotion.

Team Information

Personnel and sponsoring

Regular season

Standings

Playoffs

Semifinals 1st Leg

Semifinals 2nd Leg

Platense won the series 4-2 on aggregate

Series tied 1-1 on aggregate. Required another playoff game

Extra Play off game

Negocios Internacionales progress to the final

Finals

Final 1st Leg

Final 1st Leg

Final Playoff game

Relegation Round

remaining match not played due to irrelevance; Sonsonate were later reprieved from relegation

Top scorers
{| class="wikitable"
|- 
! align="center" | Pos
! align="center" | Player
! align="center" | Team
! align="center" | Goals
|- 
! align="center" | 1.
|  TBD
| align="center" | TBD
| align="center" | 15
|- 
! align="center" | 2
|   TBD
| align="center" | TBD
| align="center" | TBD
|- 
! align="center" | 3.
|   TBD
| align="center" | TBD
| align="center" | TBD
|- 
! align="center" | 4.
|   TBD
| align="center" | TBD
| align="center" | TBD
|- 
! align="center" | 5.
|   TBD
| align="center" | TBD
| align="center" | TBD
|- 
! align="center" | 6.
|   TBD
| align="center" | TBD
| align="center" | TBD
|- 
! align="center" | 7.
|   TBD
| align="center" | TBD
| align="center" | TBD
|- 
! align="center" | 8.
|   TBD
| align="center" | TBD
| align="center" | TBD
|- 
! align="center" | 9.
|   TBD
| align="center" | TBD
| align="center" | TBD
|- 
! align="center" | 10.
|   Tomás Pantera" Gamboa
| align="center" | FAS
| align="center" | 12
|}

List of foreign players in the league
This is a list of foreign players in 1974-1975 Campeonato. The following players:
have played at least one apetura game for the respective club.
have not been capped for the El Salvador national football team on any level, independently from the birthplace

C.D. Águila
  Ademir Barbosa
  David Pinho
  Helio Rodríguez
  Horacio Díaz Luco
 
Alianza F.C.
  Adonay Alfaro Salas 
  Adolfo Olivares
  Enrique Iturra
  Miguel Hermosilla

Atletico Marte
  José Moris

C.D. FAS
  Alcides Piccioni

Firpo
  Manolo Alvarez

 (player released mid season)  (player Injured mid season) Injury replacement player''

Municipal Limeno
  Juan Andres Rios
  Hermes Garcia
  Nelson Brizuela
  Antonio Roque
  Rodolfo Baello

Negocios Internacionales
  Miguel Angel Caban
  René Joaquín Cazalbón
  Luis Ernesto Tapia
  Roberto Fernandez

Platense
  Luis Condomi
  Norberto Ricardo Zaffanella

Sonsonate
  Leon Ugarte
  Jurandir dos Santos
  Jorge Tupinamba dos Santos
  Carlos Beltran

UES
  Tony Rojas
  Nester Hernandez

References

External links
 Official website

1974
Primera Division